Ang Bang Heng is a retired goalkeeper who last played for Woodlands Wellington FC in the S-League. He is currently the assistant goalkeeper coach for Woodlands Wellington.

He was part of the Tampines Rovers SC 1951 team which won the Singapore Pools FA Cup in 2004 and also played for Balestier Khalsa, as well as Katong FC in the NFL Division 2 before joining the Rams in 2011, where he featured prominently with 21 appearances in his first season.

Bang Heng also received a medal with Balestier Khalsa when the Tigers finished second runners-up in the 2008 Singapore League Cup.

He officially retired from professional football on 5 November 2012 following the last match of the 2012 season against Tanjong Pagar United.

Ang was known for his vocal presence in the penalty box and aerial ability.

Club Career Statistics

All numbers encased in brackets signify substitute appearances.

References

External links

1980 births
Living people
Singaporean footballers
Tampines Rovers FC players
Balestier Khalsa FC players
Woodlands Wellington FC players
Singapore Premier League players
Singaporean sportspeople of Chinese descent
Association football goalkeepers